Columbus Doors (1855–1861), also known as the Rogers Doors, are a pair of massive bronze doors modeled by sculptor Randolph Rogers for the East Front of the United States Capitol in Washington, DC. They open into the Rotunda, and depict events from the life of Christopher Columbus.

History

Rogers, an expatriate American artist trained and living in Italy, was a Neoclassical sculptor noted for his carved works in marble. He visited the United States in 1855, and was awarded the commission for the doors. He had never done anything on this scale, and was not known for working in bronze.

Rogers's sculptural theme was Scenes from the Life of Columbus. Each door has four panels illustrating significant events, and the semi-circular transom above the pair illustrates Columbus landing in the New World. The border surrounding the doors and transom is adorned with statuettes of figures who participated in the Columbus story and nautical items such as anchors and rudders. Figures around the outer rim represent Asia, Africa, Europe and America.

Between 1856 and 1858, Rogers modeled the doors first in clay, then in plaster. They were cast in bronze at the Royal Bavarian Foundry in Munich, Germany, from 1860 to 1861. Because of delays in transportation related to the American Civil War, they did not arrive in the United States until 1863. They were installed on the East Front in 1871.

With transom, the doors are 16 ft 8 in tall, and 9 ft 9 in wide. They weigh approximately 20,000 pounds (10 tons).

They were most recently treated in 2021.

In January 2021, the doors were damaged during the United States Capitol attack.

East Front extension

The Capitol's East Front was extended between 1958 and 1962. A new exterior wall was built 32.5 feet east of the old exterior wall, and the space between them became the Main Lobby, offices and the East Extension Corridor. The Columbus Doors were moved from their original location to their present location, within the new exterior wall, in 1961 following the extension of the East Front of the Capitol.

Panels

See also
 List of public art in Washington, D.C., Ward 6

Notes
Architect of the Capitol, Compilation of Works of Art and Other Objects in the United States Capitol (1965).
Architect of the Capitol, Art in the United States Capitol (Washington, DC: Smithsonian Institution Press, 1974).

External links

Columbus Doors from Smithsonian Institution Reference Information System (SIRIS).

United States Capitol art
Bronze doors
Cultural depictions of Christopher Columbus
Ships in art
Native Americans in art
Horses in art